Antytila is a Ukrainian musical group. It includes Taras Topolia (vocals), Serhii Vusyk (keyboard, artistic director), Dmytro Zholud (guitar), and Dmytro Vodovozov (drums), Mykhailo Chyrko (bass).

In 2018, Volodymyr Zelenskyy, the future president of Ukraine, participated in one of their videoclips, LEGO.

Shortly before the 2022 Russian invasion of Ukraine, the band joined the Territorial Defense Forces, having previously served as volunteers since the annexation of Crimea in 2014. In March 2022, the band made an appeal to perform remotely in the Concert for Ukraine, a benefit concert raising funds for those affected by the invasion. Their appeal included a message to singer Ed Sheeran via TikTok. The band were refused a place at the concert due to their association with the military. In response, Sheeran collaborated with the band on a remix of his song "2step", with profits from streams of the music video being donated to Music Saves UA, a fundraising project created to provide humanitarian aid in Ukraine.

References

Ukrainian musical groups
Musical groups established in 2007
Musical quartets
Musical groups from Kyiv
Ukrainian military personnel of the 2022 Russian invasion of Ukraine